Simone Spoladore (born 29 October 1979) is a Brazilian actress. Her first film role was Ana in To the Left of the Father.

Spoladore won the Gramado Film Festival’s award for Best Actress in 2010.

Filmography
To the Left of the Father (2001)
Desmundo (2002)
The Year My Parents Went on Vacation (2006)
Elvis & Madonna (2010)
Southwest (2012)

Television
Os Maias (2001) – Young Maria Monforte
Esperança (2002) – Caterina
América (2005) – Helô
O Profeta (2006) – Luci
Bela, a Feia (2009) – Verônica Matoso / Veronica Matoso
Vidas em Jogo (2011) – Andrea Vasconcellos
Magnifica 70 (2015–16) – Dora Dumar

References

External links

1979 births
Brazilian people of Italian descent
Living people
Actresses from Curitiba
21st-century Brazilian actresses
Brazilian film actresses
Brazilian telenovela actresses